Abdulaziz Al-Yousef bin Mohammed (born 6 October 1988) is a Saudi footballer who plays for Al-Washm as a winger.

References

1988 births
Living people
Saudi Arabian footballers
Association football wingers
Al-Shabab FC (Riyadh) players
Al-Taawoun FC players
Sdoos Club players
Al-Mujazzal Club players
Al-Riyadh SC players
Al-Washm Club players
Saudi First Division League players
Saudi Professional League players
Saudi Second Division players